The Wanda Mountains are located in the Heilongjiang Province of China.

The forests on the mountains are home to many rare species of plants and fungi. Among these include: black fungus, zhenmo, and wei or cinnamon fern (Osmunda cinnamomea).

Lake Jingpo is also located near this mountain range.

Mountain ranges of China
Landforms of Heilongjiang